Lorinda may refer to:
Lorinda (given name)
SS Lorinda, an Empire ship